Hindus, Christians and Muslims live in harmony in Kunnamkulam. The religious tolerance of Kunnamkulam people can be seen from the “Ambala Palli - St.Matthias Church (located at south Bazar) which is a temple converted to a church wherein the temple character can be seen in the church entrance. Elohim Christian Church Akkikavu Kunnamkulam

There are four mosques in Kunnamkulam:
 Lower Parayil near Bhavana theatre
Wadakkanchery road near Byju theatre
Guruvayoor road opposite E.M.S. shopping complex
Town bus stand, Yatheem Khana building (no Friday prayer)

Temples
 Lord Siva temple
 Kakkad temple
 Kizhur Temple
 Panthallur
 Cheeramkulam Devi temple, Chemmannur
 Annakulangara
 Subramannya temple
 Sreeramaswami temple chiralayam
 Makkalikkavu Devi Temple, Thekkeppuram
 Subramanya swamy Temple, Kaniyampal
 Kavilakkad temple, Chittanjoor
 Parkadi Temple, Anjoor
 Sankarapuram Mahavishnu Temple
 Ubhayur Mahadeva Temple, Kanippayyur
 Ayyamkulangare Temple, Puthussery
 Kattakampal shiva temple
 Pengamuck shiva temple

The famous Srikrishna Temple in Guruvayur is located just 8 km away from Kunnamkulam.

Churches
 Arthat St. Mary's Cathedral Church (Arthat Valliyapally), AD 999
 Mar Behanam Chapel, Anjoor - Misc
 St. George Cathedral Church, Thozhiyur - Malabar Independent Syrian Church
 Arthat Mar Thoma Syrian church
 Nativity of Our Lady Church, Puthussery 
 Kunnamkulam St. Lazarus Orthodox Old Church
 St.Sebastians catholic church
 Kunnamkulam St. Thomas Orthodox New Church
 Arthat St. Mary's Simhasana church (Tomb of St. Sleeba Mor Osthatheos)
 Kunnamkulam Main Road St. Gregorios Orthodox church
 Kunnakulam St.Thomas Hill Church - Misc
 Adupputty St. George Orthodox church (Feast of Adupatty church called as Kunnamkulam Pooram)
 St. Lazarus Orthodox church Chiralayam
 St. Paul's CSI Church,
 South Bazar St Mathiyas Orthodox Church (it is popularly known as Ambalam pally.)
 St. Mary's Orthodox Syrian Church Pazhanji Pazhanji Church (also known as Pazhanji Palli, https://www.facebook.com/pazhanjichurch)
 Pazhanji Brethren Assembly
 The Disciples Tabernacle Church Kunnamkulam
 Bethany Church
 Mar Joseph Church, Chaldean Syrian Church, Kunnamkulam
 St. George Orthodox Syrian Church, Mele Parayil Kunnamkulam
  St. Adhais Church, Porkulam -  Misc
 St. Mary's Syrian Church, Pazhanji - Misc
 Kattakambal St. Ignatious Orthodox church
 Pengamuck Mar Baselios Mar Gregorios Orthodox church
 Pengamuck St. Peter's and St Paul's Orthodox Church
 Kottol church
 Akikavu St. Mary's Orthodox Church
 St. George's Church Kallupuram - Misc

References

Religious buildings and structures in Thrissur district